Jockusch is a German surname. Notable people with the surname include:

 Carl Jockusch (born 1941), American mathematician
 Elizabeth Jockusch, American biologist 
 Harald Jockusch (born 1939), German biologist and artist
 Rebecca Jockusch, Canadian chemist

German-language surnames